Neduveerppukal is a 1991 Indian Malayalam film, directed by Suresh Heblicker.

Cast

References

External links
 

1991 films
1990s Malayalam-language films